Clara Amfo (born 22 May 1984) is a British radio broadcaster, television presenter, podcast host and voice-over artist. She is known for presenting her shows on BBC Radio 1.

Early life and education
Amfo was born in Kingston upon Thames in London to Ghanaian parents. Her father, who died in 2015, was an NHS microbiologist, and her mother a hospital cleaner. After leaving high school, she went on to study media arts with professional and creative writing at St Mary's University College.

Career
Amfo started out as a marketing intern at Kiss FM. During her time there she became a presenter, starting out on early breakfast, weekend breakfast and left doing the drive time show. In September 2013, Amfo joined BBC Radio 1Xtra as host of the weekend breakfast show. 

In 2015, Amfo became the host of The Official Chart on BBC Radio 1. In February 2015 it was announced she would be leaving 1Xtra to take over from Fearne Cotton as host of Radio 1's weekday mid-morning show – home of the Live Lounge – on 25 May 2015. During her time in the slot she interviewed Jay-Z, Dua Lipa, Kendrick Lamar and Ariana Grande. 

Amfo has hosted premieres for No Time to Die, Black Panther, The Lion King and House of Gucci. Since February 2017, Amfo presented backstage at the BRIT Awards for ITV2.    

In January 2020, Amfo launched her podcast 'This City' with famous Londoners exploring about their relationship with the capital, guest's included Louis Theroux, Akala, Jade Thirlwall, Mark Ronson and Ncuti Gatwa. 

In June 2020, Amfo was widely praised for making a speech on her mid-morning show on BBC Radio 1, about George Floyd's murder, racism and its effect on her own mental health. On 20 April 2021, it was announced on Greg James' Radio 1 Breakfast show that Amfo would be taking over Annie Mac's Future Sounds show on Radio 1 from 30 July 2021, following Mac's announcement she would be leaving the station. It was also announced that Rickie, Melvin and Charlie would take over Amfo's current Live Lounge show. 

In March 2021, Amfo was honoured with a Barbie 'Shero' doll. 

In July 2021, Amfo recorded an hour long interview special in L.A. with Billie Eilish for BBC One.

Amfo was a contestant on the eighteenth series of Strictly Come Dancing. She was partnered with Aljaž Škorjanec. She was eliminated in week 6 of the competition.  

In June 2021, Amfo appeared alongside her brother, Andy, on the third series of Celebrity Gogglebox.

In December 2021, Amfo appeared on the revived series of The Weakest Link and won the competition in episode 1.

On 22 February 2022, she was a guest judge on the Snatch Game episode of RuPaul's Drag Race: UK vs the World.

References

External links
 
 
 Radio 1's Future Sounds with Clara Amfo (BBC Radio 1)
 Radio 1's Hottest Records of the Week (BBC Radio 1)

1984 births
Living people
English people of Ghanaian descent
British radio presenters
BBC Radio 1 presenters
BBC Radio 1Xtra presenters
English radio personalities
Black British DJs
Black British radio presenters
Women DJs
People from Kingston upon Thames
Alumni of St Mary's University, Twickenham
21st-century women musicians
British women radio presenters
Comic Relief people
Top of the Pops presenters